Port of Baku is a sea port located in the Bay of Baku, on the coast of city of Baku, Azerbaijan. The main entrance faces the Neftchiler Avenue.

History
The Baku port was built in 1902 and claims itself to be the largest and busiest port of the Caspian Sea. It is considered to be the main marine gateway to Azerbaijan. The port operates non-stop and is a transit point in Europe-Asia trade promoted within Transport Corridor Europe-Caucasus-Asia project established in May 1993 in Brussels.

In the warmer periods of April to November when Russian inner waterways are navigable, the Baku International Sea Trade Port is accessible for cargo ships from West European and Mediterranean ports. With Azerbaijan's rising exports of energy resources primarily based offshore, the exploration and development equipment is delivered through the Baku port.

It was among the world's leading ports and the largest of the Russian Empire in terms of cargo and passenger traffic. Various types of dry cargo such as cotton, fruit and sugar, were among some of the main trade goods at Port of Baku and other ports on the Caspian Sea such as Astrakhan, Krasnovodsk (today's Turkmenbashi), Petrovsk (today's Makhachkala) and Iranian ports. Already by 1900, annual cargo traffic had reached 6.5 million tonnes (around 400 million Russian ‘poods’) and the port served a total of 157,779 passengers in 1912. The Russian Empire also took advantage of the transit potential of Port of Baku with around 38.1 million ‘poods’ passing through Port of Baku as cargo in transit.
After gaining independence, the Republic of Azerbaijan established close economic relations with neighbouring countries. In 1998, Baku city held an international conference on the ‘Historic Silk Road’ in order to revive this ancient trade route and create the foundations for further processes of integration with the countries involved.

Terminals
The port consists of the Main Cargo Terminal, Dubendy Oil Terminal, Ferry Terminal, and Passenger Terminal. Its throughput capacity has been constantly growing and is now 15 million tons of liquid bulk and 10 million tons of dry cargoes.

The Main Cargo Terminal has 6 berths of total length of 866 meters. They are equipped with 16 portal cranes with lifting capacity up to 40 tons. 8 kilometers of stub railways ensure timely handling of cargo. The container terminal handles 100,000 containers annually. The ferry and passenger terminal provides transport for passengers travelling or shipping items to Turkmenbashi, Aktau, Oily Rocks and Iranian ports. There are about 20 vessels belonging to the port fleet.

According to the Order of the President of the Republic of Azerbaijan on the ‘Construction of New Baku International Sea Trade Port Complex’ signed on March 18, 2007 the existing sea trade port will be demolished completely after the construction of a new port complex in Alat settlement, 65 km south of Baku. The new port will provide general cargo and passenger terminals, cargo handling and Ro/Ro facilities, rail ferry terminal connecting the ports of Aktau and Turkmenbashi as well as International Logistics Centre. The foundation of the new port complex was laid down in November 2010.

Alat

The new Port of Baku at Alat is a transportation hub linking the west (Turkey & EU), south (Iran & India) and north (Russia & Northern Europe). Situated in the vicinity of the regions of Azerbaijan, it will also increase its connectivity as an efficient hub and so increase the volume of cargo being handled. In addition, new port location is linked to existing highways and railways, connecting the port to the inland regions of the country. There are three international rail routes into Azerbaijan, which all converge at Alat:

 To the northwest, passing through Baku to Russia 
 To the west, passing through Georgia to the shores of the Black Sea and Turkey. 
 To the south and to the border area with Iran.

Phase One
The new Port of Baku at Alat will be capable of serving 150 – 160 metre-long, 10,000 tonne capacity ferries and all other types of vessels serving the Caspian Sea. The location enables a modular expansion of all the facilities for different cargo segments (rail ferry, general cargo, container and bulk) once cargo turnover increases. Phase One of the new port in Alat comprises a ferry terminal, a general cargo berth, a Ro-Ro berth, a service berth, railway lines, various administrative buildings, a customs holding area, an open storage yard, warehouses, a container yard, rail and road access to berths, a Ro-Ro ramp, a passenger service building, a heavy lift landing area and a truck amenities area. Project completion dates for Phase One have been divided into three stages. The first stage—the Ferry (Rail) Terminal—was completed in September 2014; the second stage—the Ro-Ro Berth—will be completed in 2016; and the remaining works in 2017. 80% of the overall work for Phase One has already been completed. The lengths of the quays are as follows:

 Ferry (Rail) Terminal (two berths and a central jetty with a berth on either side), able to accommodate ‘Zarifa Aliyeva Rail Ferry’ type vessels (LOA 154.5 m, width 18.3m) 
 General Cargo Quay – 650 m (4 berths) 
 Ro-Ro Quay – 300 m (1 berth) 
 Service Berth – 450 m (multiple berths)

The berths are all dredged to -7 m Caspian datum. All direct transit rail transhipments between Azerbaijan and Europe or Central Asia (onto China and the rest of Asia) are via this Ferry (Rail) Terminal. Currently, if containers are transported to their final destination on a rail platform (without being unloaded and loaded onto a container vessel) they are transferred directly onto a rail platform and use the Ferry Terminal in the New Port. If they are unloaded from a rail platform and then loaded onto a dedicated container vessel, then they come to the old port in downtown Baku. With the completion of Phase One, all such intermodal operations will be done in the new Port of Baku at Alat. The completion of Phase One will also see an overall cargo throughput at the new Port of Baku at Alat of 10–11.5 million tonnes of general cargo and 40,000–50,000 TEU in containers.

Phase Two and Phase Three
The expansion of the New Port is linked to the increased flow in potential cargo and on the speed of growth of the various business segments. In other words, the decision on when to start the construction of Phase Two and Phase Three will depend on existing cargo volumes. In general, these next phases are likely to follow the PPP (or BOT) type of partnership model, whereby a private party will likely invest, construct and operate these expansions. The forecasts for the three phases are as follows:

 Phase One: 10–11.5 million tons of general cargo + 40,000–50,000 TEU; 
 Phase Two: 17 million tons of general cargo + 150,000 TEU;
 Phase Three: 21–25 million tons of general cargo + up to 1 million TEU.

Baku International Sea Trade Port Complex was opened on 14 May 2018 at Alat. Ilham Aliyev has participated in the opening of Baku International Sea Trade Port Complex.

According to the order of President Ilham Aliyev dated April 13, 2017 "On additional measures to accelerate the construction of the New Baku International Sea Trade Port complex ", the continuation and finalization of  the project were given to the Ministry of Economy. A Plan of Action has been prepared in this direction for the timely and quality execution of works with indication of the start and end dates. Nearly 1,500 workforce and about 300 different types of machinery were involved in the construction process. General Plan and project of the new port complex, the winner of the international open tender have been prepared by the "Royal Haskoning" company. Construction work was carried out in two parts of the port area - offshore and onshore segments by the local company - "Evrascon" OJSC.

Advisory agreement with UAE's DP World

The Azerbaijani government, the Port of Baku and the group of companies DP Worlds (Dubai Port World – one of the world's largest port operators) signed an agreement to provide consulting services for the establishment of a free trade zone in Alat settlement of Baku.
The document was undersigned by Deputy Economy Minister Niyazi Safarov, Director General of Baku International Sea Trade Port Taleh Ziyadov and President of the DP Worlds group Sultan Ahmed bin Sulayem at the special ceremony on September 7.
President Ilham Aliyev signed a decree on March 17, 2016 on the measures to create special economic area of a free trade zone type in the Alat township of Baku's Garadagh district.
Azerbaijani Economy Minister Shahin Mustafayev, who addressed the signing ceremony, noted that it is important to use Azerbaijan's transit potential for ensuring the sustainable development of the country.

Director-General of the Port of Baku Taleh Ziyadov said that Free Trade Zone project envisages the development of transport and logistics industry, pharmaceutical cluster, common-use oil supply base facilities, manufacturing, packaging, labeling and consolidation areas. “This is a part of a larger strategy of country’s president, Mr. Ilham Aliyev, to strengthen Azerbaijan’s non-oil economy and diversify it away from hydrocarbons,” he added.

Baku has everything necessary to become a focal point of Eurasia, Sultan Ahmed bin Sulayem noted during the meeting.
"We want to turn Baku into a coordination center of Eurasia. We believe that you have the necessary components for this – high-tech and resources. And we have the experience. Combining all this we (DP World and Baku International Sea Trade Port) can become a single strong commercial structure," he said. 
"We want the commercial port not to be some kind of alternative for entrepreneurs, but become a necessity for businesses, as once we did in Dubai," Ahmed bin Sulayem noted.

Currently, about 80% of cargo is deemed to be transshipment, while 20% is gateway (such as fuel, construction materials, agriculture products and so on). This percentage split is likely to change with the start of FTZ, envisioned to be similar to the Jebel Ali Free Zone (Jafza), UAE. With it, the new Port of Baku will act as a major logistics hub in Central Eurasia, serving both European and Asian markets, as well as being part of an extensive international logistics network linking Europe and Asia. In particular, Port of Baku will trade & become the major centre for consolidation, concentration and distribution, providing a wide range of value-added services in the region to the markets of the South Caucasus, Central Asia, Iran, southern Russia and Turkey. There are a significant number of activities that can be classified as value-added services in the field of logistics. Generally, they fall into two categories:
•	General Logistics Services, including storage, loading and unloading, stripping, unstuffing, groupage, consolidation and distribution.
•	Value-Added Logistics (VAL), including repackaging, customizing, assembly, quality control, testing, repair, on-terminal, auto-accessorizing, grain storage and fumigating, news print storage, storage of commodities and transfer and in-container garment assembly.
General value-added services include services such as the maintenance, renting and leasing of equipment, cleaning facilities, tanking, safety, security services, offices and information and communication services of various kinds. VAL activities, in particular, are growing in importance as producers concentrate on meeting the demands of customers for high quality specialized products. New players in this field of third party logistics services providers will be attracted to the Port of Baku at Alat to take over parts of the production chain (assembly, quality control, customizing, packaging and others) and of the after-sales services (including repair and re-use).
FTZ would be in a natural position to participate in this logistics niche. It will be linked to other Caspian ports via high quality maritime connections through the New Port of Baku at Alat, and intermodal road and rail transport services from Alat to Georgia, Iran, Turkey, Russia and southeast Europe, while also providing air freight services from Baku International Airport.
The activity in FTZ will create an additional volume of cargo aimed at exports. The majority of these cargoes is likely to be transported in containers via the various intermodal forms of transport.

Gallery

See also

Transport in Azerbaijan
State Maritime Administration of Azerbaijan Republic

References

Bays of Azerbaijan
Baku
Buildings and structures in Baku
Public transport companies in Azerbaijan
Caspian Sea